The Campbell Motor Car Company was an automobile manufacturer, in business for only one year, from 1918 to 1919.

History 
The Campbell Motor Car Company was originally called the Emerson Motors Company. But, in 1917, after the company was charged with stock manipulation, Theodore A. Campbell and his brother George renamed the company after themselves. While the car made by the Emerson company was a low $395, the new Campbell, a small, 4-cylinder 22 hp car, cost $835, compared to a Ford Model T Touring Car that cost $360. In May 1919, the company went into receivership. Less than 600 cars were made.

References

Defunct motor vehicle manufacturers of the United States